Baboosic Lake (buh-BOO-sik) is a  lake on the border of the towns of Amherst and Merrimack, in New Hampshire. The lake drains into Baboosic Brook, a tributary of the Merrimack River.

Baboosic is a "warm water lake" and supports fish species such as chain pickerel, largemouth bass, yellow perch, catfish, and many sunfish.  During winter months the lake freezes and is suitable for ice fishing, ice skating and snowmobiling.

Baboosic was once a popular destination for vacationers who traveled via the historical Boston & Maine Railroad Manchester & Milford branch train.

A Jewish summer camp for children ages 8–15, called Camp Young Judaea, is on the lake.

See also

List of lakes in New Hampshire

References

External links
Baboosic Lake Association
NH Fish & Game Department map of Baboosic Lake

Lakes of Hillsborough County, New Hampshire